Stacie Lynne Terry-Hutson (born October 8, 1976) is an American basketball coach and former player who is currently the head women's basketball coach at San Diego State University.

Early life, education, and pro basketball career
Born Stacie Lynne Terry in San Diego, Terry-Hutson graduated from El Capitan High School in nearby Lakeside in 1994. At the University of Texas at Arlington, Terry-Hutson was a four-year guard for the Texas–Arlington Mavericks from 1994 to 1998. As a junior in 1996–97, Terry started all 28 games and averaged 10.3 points and 5.6 rebounds. In her senior season of 1997–98, Terry-Hutson was the team's leading scorer with 17.4 points and averaged 4.4 rebounds.

In 1998–99, Terry-Hutson played one season of pro basketball for the Polish team Polonia Phoenix, averaging 12.0 points and 6.0 rebounds.

Coaching career

Assistant coach (1999–2013)
In 1999, Terry-Hutson returned to UT Arlington women's basketball to be a graduate assistant. Then from 2000 to 2003, Terry-Hutson was an assistant coach at Louisville under head coach Martin Clapp. Clapp resigned from Louisville after the 2002–03 season. Terry subsequently became assistant coach at Dayton for the 2003–04 season under Jim Jabir.

On September 17, 2004, Terry-Hutson became an assistant coach at Illinois under Theresa Grentz. After Grentz retired following the 2006–07 season, Terry-Hutson moved to Southern Miss on July 23, 2007 as an assistant coach under Joye Lee-McNelis. The 2007–08 Southern Miss team finished the season 21–14 with a third round appearance in the 2008 Women's National Invitation Tournament.

Terry-Hutson was an assistant coach at UCLA from 2008 to 2011 and LSU from 2011 to 2013.

San Diego State (2013–present)
Terry-Hutson was hired as head coach at San Diego State on May 15, 2013. In her first season, Terry led San Diego State to a 13–17 (9–9 Mountain West Conference) record for a sixth place tie in conference standings.

In 2019–20, San Diego State finished 14–17 (9–9 MW) with a tie for fifth in MW standings, the best finish under Terry-Hutson. Following that season, Terry-Hutson signed a contract extension on April 2, 2020 through the 2023–24 season. However, outside the 2019–20 season, San Diego State has not finished better than sixth place in the Mountain West, and San Diego State has never had a winning record under Terry-Hutson either. Following a 15–16 (8–10 MW) season in 2021–22, Terry has a cumulative 109–161 record at San Diego State.

Head coaching record

Personal life 
In 2019, Terry  married Justin Hutson, head men's basketball coach at Fresno State. They met when Justin was a men's basketball assistant coach at San Diego State.

References

External links 
 San Diego State Aztecs profile

1976 births
Living people
Basketball players from San Diego
Basketball coaches from California
Guards (basketball)
UT Arlington Mavericks women's basketball players
UT Arlington Mavericks women's basketball coaches
Louisville Cardinals women's basketball coaches
Dayton Flyers women's basketball coaches
Illinois Fighting Illini women's basketball coaches
Southern Miss Lady Eagles basketball coaches
UCLA Bruins women's basketball coaches
LSU Lady Tigers basketball coaches
San Diego State Aztecs women's basketball coaches
People from Lakeside, California
American expatriate basketball people in Poland